Mark F. Burns  (May 24, 1841 – January 16, 1898) was an  American politician who served on the Board of Aldermen, as a member  and President of the Common Council, and as the  sixth Mayor, of Somerville, Massachusetts.

Notes

1841 births
1898 deaths
People from Milford, New Hampshire
Mayors of Somerville, Massachusetts
Massachusetts city council members
Massachusetts Republicans
19th-century American politicians